Leigh Mercer (1893–1977) was a British wordplay and recreational mathematics expert.

Career

Palindrome
Mercer is best known for devising the palindrome "A man, a plan, a canal: Panama!".

Mathematical limerick

The following mathematical limerick is attributed to him:

This is read as follows:
 A dozen, a gross, and a score
 Plus three times the square root of four
 Divided by seven
 Plus five times eleven
 Is nine squared and not a bit more.

References

1893 births
1977 deaths
Recreational cryptographers
Word games
Word play
Mathematical humor
Palindromists